Boronia railway station is located on the Belgrave line in Victoria, Australia. It serves the eastern Melbourne suburb of Boronia, and it opened on 19 June 1920.

History

Boronia station opened on 19 June 1920 and, like the suburb itself, was named after a suggestion by local councillor Albert Chandler, who grew boronia plants for a nursery he owned nearby.

In 1952, flashing light signals were provided at the former Boronia Road level crossing, which was located in the Down direction of the station. In 1957, duplication of the line between Bayswater and Lower Fern Tree Gully occurred, with a second platform provided at the former ground-level station. On 19 December 1959, the station was closed to all goods traffic.

In 1971, boom barriers were provided at the former level crossing. In 1985, the station was rebuilt, and included new station buildings and passenger facilities, as well as an upgrade to the bus interchange facilities. On 2 July 1996, Boronia was upgraded to a Premium Station.

In 1998, a new below ground station was built, as part of a grade separation project to remove the nearby Boronia Road level crossing. On 5 November of that year, the rebuilt station opened.

After extensive community activism, the Andrews government announced a $60 million upgrade of the station if re-elected at the 2022 State Election. Boronia station will be decked over to create new open space, as well as better connections to the surrounding shopping strips. The decking will also create direct pedestrian access from the car park to the Dorset Road shops, making it easier to get around central Boronia. The station facilities will undergo a major overhaul with building upgrades, improved lighting, CCTV, platform upgrades, accessibility upgrades, and new furniture to create a modern station. The bus interchange will also receive new shelters, seating, and signage.

Platforms and services

Boronia has one island platform with two faces. It is served by Belgrave line trains.

Platform 1:
  all stations and limited express services to Flinders Street; all stations shuttle services to Ringwood

Platform 2:
  all stations services to Upper Ferntree Gully and Belgrave

Transport links

Ventura Bus Lines operates six routes via Boronia station, under contract to Public Transport Victoria:
 : to Croydon station
 : to Waverley Gardens Shopping Centre
 : Croydon station – Monash University Clayton Campus
 : to Bayswater station
 : Glen Waverley station – Bayswater station
 : Bayswater station – Westfield Knox

References

External links
 
 Melway map at street-directory.com.au
 Weston Langford - Boronia

Premium Melbourne railway stations
Railway stations in Melbourne
Railway stations in Australia opened in 1920
Railway stations in the City of Knox